Isabel Leonard (born February 18, 1982) is an American mezzo-soprano opera singer based in New York City. She is of Argentine ancestry on her mother's side.

Education
Leonard was born in New York City. For five years she sang with the Manhattan School of Music children's chorus. She attended the Joffrey Ballet School. She is a graduate of The Cathedral School of St. John the Divine and the Fiorello H. LaGuardia High School of Music & Art and Performing Arts. She earned her Bachelor of Music and Master of Music degrees at the Juilliard School, where she was a pupil of Edith Bers. She has also studied with Marilyn Horne, Brian Zeger, Warren Jones, and Margo Garrett. She is a 2005 winner of the Marilyn Horne Foundation Vocal Competition. In 2006, she received The Licia Albanese-Puccini Foundation Award. She was also chosen as a recipient of a Movado Future Legends award in 2006. In 2013, she received the Richard Tucker Music Foundation Award.

Career
In New York, Leonard has performed with the Chamber Music Society of Lincoln Center and with the Juilliard Opera Center. Her first appearance with the New York Philharmonic was in a concert version of Leonard Bernstein's Candide, and she later sang the part of the Squirrel in L'enfant et les sortilèges in concert with the orchestra and Lorin Maazel. In February 2007, Leonard made her professional operatic stage debut as Stéphano in Roméo et Juliette. In September 2007, she made her Metropolitan Opera debut in the same role. Leonard made her debut with Santa Fe Opera as Cherubino in 2008. Her commercial recordings include a DVD recording for Euroarts as Dorabella in the 2009 Salzburg Festival production of Così fan tutte. On April 26, 2014, Leonard sang the role of Dorabella in a performance at the Metropolitan Opera that was transmitted worldwide as part of the Metropolitan Opera Live in HD program. In February 2011, Leonard made her Vienna State Opera debut singing Cherubino in Le nozze di Figaro, returning to the venue in January 2012 as Rosina in Il barbiere di Siviglia. 2014 to 2016 Leonard and Sharon Isbin performed a well-received series of eleven soprano/guitar-duet recitals, including at Zankel Hall (Carnegie Hall). Leonard sang the lead role in the American premiere of Marnie at the Met in New York in October 2018.

Leonard won two Grammy Awards for Best Opera Recording: in 2014 for Thomas Adès' The Tempest, and in 2016 for Maurice Ravel's L'enfant et les sortilèges. In 2021 she won the Grammy Award for Best Classical Compendium for From the Diary of Anne Frank & Meditations on Rilke, conducted by Michael Tilson Thomas.

Her grandfather Carlos Guimard (1913–1998) was an Argentine chess grandmaster. Leonard married baritone Teddy Tahu Rhodes in December 2008; they divorced around 2013. Leonard raises their son, Teo, born 17 May 2010.

Repertory
Stéphano in Roméo et Juliette, 2007 (Met debut)
Rosina in The Barber of Seville
Angelina (Cinderella) in La Cenerentola
Cherubino in Le nozze di Figaro
Sextus in Giulio Cesare, 2011
Miranda in The Tempest
Dorabella in Così fan tutte
Zerlina in Don Giovanni
Charlotte in Werther
Blanche de la Force in Dialogues des Carmélites
Marnie in Marnie
Mélisande in Pelléas et Mélisande

References

External links
 
 "Movado Future Legends Honors Five Emerging Artists", Jazz News
, from The Marriage of Figaro, Metropolitan Opera, 2014

Living people
American operatic mezzo-sopranos
Fiorello H. LaGuardia High School alumni
1982 births
Richard Tucker Award winners
Singers from New York City
American people of Argentine descent
Manhattan School of Music alumni
Juilliard School alumni
21st-century American  women opera singers
Grammy Award winners
Music Academy of the West alumni
Classical musicians from New York (state)
Marilyn Horne Song Competition winners